Roger Turtle (fl. 1326-1344) was an English politician. He was the member of parliament for Bristol in 1344. He was mayor of Bristol in 1326, 1330, 1332, 1333, 1335, 1340 and 1341.

References

Year of birth missing
14th-century deaths
English MPs 1344
Members of the Parliament of England for Bristol
Mayors of Bristol